Homaloxestis cholopis is a moth in the family Lecithoceridae. It is found in Taiwan, China (Fujian, Guangdong, Hainan, Yunnan), Myanmar, Nepal, India, Java and south-western Africa.

The wingspan is 14.5–17 mm. The forewings are rather dark fuscous and the hindwings are whitish-grey, greyer posteriorly.

References

Moths described in 1906
Homaloxestis
Moths of Africa